The system on higher education in Austria distinguishes between federal universities (Universitäten), private universities (Privatuniversitäten), and universities of applied science (Fachhochschulen). The three types are based on different laws. One of the main differences—but not the only one—is funding. Two institutions in Lower Austria have a special legal status. Since 2012, the Agentur für Qualitätssicherung und Akkreditierung Austria (AQ Austria) is responsible for the educational accreditation of universities. 

List of universities in Austria:

By state

Burgenland
Private university:
European Peace University in Stadtschlaining
University of applied sciences:
University of Applied Sciences Burgenland in Eisenstadt and Pinkafeld

Carinthia
Federal university:
University of Klagenfurt
University of applied science:
 Carinthia University of Applied Sciences in Spittal an der Drau, Klagenfurt, Villach, and Feldkirchen in Kärnten

Lower Austria
University for continuing education:
University for Continuing Education Krems in Krems
Private universities:
Benedict XVI Philosophical-Theological University, Heiligenkreuz
Danube Private University in Krems
New Design University in Sankt Pölten
 Karl Landsteiner University of Health Sciences in Krems
 Bertha von Suttner Private University in Sankt Pölten
Universities of applied science:
IMC University of Applied Sciences Krems in Krems
University of Applied Sciences in Wiener Neustadt
St. Pölten University of Applied Sciences in Sankt Pölten
Theresian Military Academy in Wiener Neustadt
Not a university, but an institution with PhD programmes:
Institute of Science and Technology Austria in Klosterneuburg

Salzburg
Federal universities:
University of Salzburg
Mozarteum University Salzburg
Private universities:
Paracelsus Medical University in Salzburg
Alma Mater Europaea in Salzburg and campuses in other countries
Private University Seeburg Castle in Seekirchen am Wallersee
University of applied sciences:
Salzburg University of Applied Sciences in Puch bei Hallein and in Kuchl

Styria
Federal universities:
University of Graz
Graz University of Technology
Medical University of Graz
University of Leoben
University of Music and Performing Arts Graz
Universities of applied science:
FH Joanneum in Graz
Campus 02 University of Applied Sciences in Graz
University college:
University College of Teacher Education Styria

Tyrol
Federal universities:
University of Innsbruck (Leopold-Franzens-Universität Innsbruck)
Medical University of Innsbruck
Private university:
UMIT Tirol - Private University for Health Sciences and Health Technology in Hall in Tirol
Universities of applied science:
University of Applied Sciences in Kufstein
MCI Management Center Innsbruck
FH Gesundheit in Innsbruck

Upper Austria
Federal universities:
Johannes Kepler University Linz
University of Art and Design Linz
Private universities:
Catholic Private University Linz
Anton Bruckner Private University, Linz
University of Applied Sciences
University of Applied Sciences Upper Austria in Hagenberg im Mühlkreis, Linz, Steyr and Wels

Vienna
Federal universities:
University of Vienna
TU Wien
Medical University of Vienna
Vienna University of Economics and Business ("Vienna University of Economics and Business Administration" prior to 2008)
Academy of Fine Arts Vienna
University of Applied Arts Vienna
University of Natural Resources and Life Sciences, Vienna
University of Music and Performing Arts Vienna
University of Veterinary Medicine Vienna
Private universities:
Jam Music Lab
Music and Arts University of the City of Vienna
Sigmund Freud University Vienna
Modul University Vienna 
Webster Vienna Private University
Central European University
Universities of Applied Sciences:
Fachhochschule des bfi Wien
University of Applied Sciences Technikum Wien
FH Campus Wien
FHWien
Lauder Business School
Ferdinand Porsche Fern FH-Studiengänge

Vorarlberg
University of Applied Sciences:
Vorarlberg University of Applied Sciences in Dornbirn

See also
 List of schools in Austria
 List of colleges and universities by country
 List of colleges and universities
 Open access in Austria

External links
https://web.archive.org/web/20030801135019/http://www.univie.ac.at/links/uni_uniinoe.html

Education in Austria

Universities
Austria
Austria